Gilberto Loyo (4 February 1901 – 1973) was a Mexican economist and politician.  He was a member of the Institutional Revolutionary Party and Secretary of Economy under President Adolfo Ruiz Cortines.  He was the founder of the National association of economists in Mexico.

Mexican Secretaries of Economy
Institutional Revolutionary Party politicians
20th-century Mexican economists
1901 births
1973 deaths
People from Veracruz
Grand Crosses 1st class of the Order of Merit of the Federal Republic of Germany